Feng County may refer to two counties in China:

Feng County, Shaanxi, under the administration of Baoji, Shaanxi
Feng County, Jiangsu, under the administration of Xuzhou, Jiangsu